DAV Post Graduate College, also known as DAV Degree College is a college in Varanasi, Uttar Pradesh, India, admitted to the privileges of Banaras Hindu University and recognised by University Grants Commission. The college has been awarded with A+ Grade by NAAC in 2017. It was established in 1938 by Pandit Ram Narayan Mishra and Shri Gauri Shankar Prasad.

History
DAV Post Graduate College started in 1938 as an Intermediate college. From 1938 to 1947, DAV was recognised by Banaras Hindu University. In 1947, BHU accorded degree status to DAV PG College and in 1954 a permanent affiliation was accorded to DAV PG College. It was in the same year, that DAV commenced undergraduate courses in arts, social sciences and commerce. In 2008, after permission from BHU, the DAV college introduced postgraduate degrees in select subjects and also PhD course.

See also

List of educational institutions in Varanasi

References

External links
 

Colleges in India
Universities and colleges in Varanasi
Universities and colleges affiliated with the Arya Samaj
Banaras Hindu University
1938 establishments in India
Educational institutions established in 1938